István Hircsák (Csák) (18 February 1915 – 31 December 1985) was a Hungarian ice hockey and field hockey player who competed in the 1936 Winter Olympics and 1936 Summer Olympics. In 1936 he was part of the Hungarian ice hockey team which was eliminated in the second round of the Olympic tournament. He played all six matches as goaltender. At the 1936 Summer Games, he was a member of the Hungarian field hockey team which was eliminated in the group stage of the Olympic tournament. He played all three matches as goalkeeper.

Csák migrated to the United Kingdom in 1956. He was the father of Steve Hilton, a British political strategist known for his work with former British Prime Minister David Cameron.

References

External links
 
István Csák's profile at Sports Reference.com
István Csák's profile at the Hungarian Olympic Committee 
István Csák's profile at eliteprospects.com

1915 births
1985 deaths
Hungarian ice hockey goaltenders
Hungarian male field hockey players
Olympic ice hockey players of Hungary
Olympic field hockey players of Hungary
Ice hockey players at the 1936 Winter Olympics
Field hockey players at the 1936 Summer Olympics
Sportspeople from Budapest
20th-century Hungarian people